Kilmore East is a locality in the Australian state of Victoria, 65 kilometres north of Melbourne.

Kilmore East was occupied for European use by John Green, a neighboring pastoralist on the Kilmore Plains, when the best of Green’s squatting property was purchased from beneath his feet by William Rutledge in 1841. Green’s head station was built 400 metres SSE of what became the Kilmore East Railway Station.

Kilmore East railway and telegraph station was established in 1872 to serve Kilmore.

The Post Office at Kilmore East opened on 1 September 1872 as Gavan Duffy, named after 
Sir Charles Gavan Duffy the Premier of Victoria until June of that 
year. It was renamed Kilmore East two months later and closed in 1976. Gavan Street and Duffy 
Street are reminders of the original township name.

In 1976, a bluestone quarry was developed 3 km to the north of the station.

A hilltop above Saunders Road was identified as the starting point of a major bushfire on 7 February 2009 that devastated many localities to the south-east including Wandong and Kinglake. An investigation put some of the blame on a recloser that tried to restore power to a "dangling" power line.

See also
Black Saturday bushfires
Recloser

References

Towns in Victoria (Australia)
Shire of Mitchell